Chełm Land or Kholmshchyna ( or Chełmszczyzna,  Kholmshchyna) is a historic region (ziemia) of eastern Poland and the adjacent areas of present-day Ukraine and Belarus. In the Polish–Lithuanian Commonwealth (1569–1795), Chełm Land was an exclave of the Ruthenian Voivodeship, completely separated from the main part of it by the Bełz Voivodeship. The region's most important town was Chełm. In the Commonwealth, Chełm Land enjoyed a special status, and even though it belonged to the Ruthenian Voivodeship, in some documents it was described as a separate, Chełm Voivodeship (Latin: Palatinatus Chelmensis).

History
At the beginning, Chełm Land  was inhabited by West Slavic (Polish) tribe Lendians. In 981 year, this territory was conquered by the ruler of Kievan Rus Volodymyr the Great. To 981 Chełm Land was part of Poland. At this time, according to Polish historian Ryszard Orłowski, ruler of Kievan Rus resettled Poles into Rus, ruthenized them and brought Ruthenians to these lands.

The area of future Chełm Land was located between early Kingdom of Poland and Kievan Rus. Both states fought for it in the 10th century, and after several conflicts, in ca. 1240 King Daniel of Galicia made Chełm capital of an Orthodox Diocese, which resulted in quick development of the town. Following Mongol invasion of Rus', which weakened Ruthenian states, the Grand Duchy of Lithuania, a new power in Eastern Europe, occupied Chełm. In 1340, the town was annexed by Polish King Kazimierz Wielki, together with Belz, Red Ruthenia and Podolia. At first, the Land of Chełm was united with the Land of Belz, but in 1387, King Wladyslaw Jagiello handed Belz as a fief to Duke of Mazovia Siemowit, while Chełm was directly annexed by the Polish Crown. Older sources claim that Chełm Land became part of Ruthenian Voivodeship at the time of its creation in 1434, but according to new research, it remained an independent unit of administration, with its own sejmik, until probably early 16th century.

At first Chełm Land consisted of Chełm County and Krasnystaw County, but in 1392 it was expanded by the area of Hrubieszow, which had previously belonged to Belz Land. Furthermore, in the 1430s, Chełm Land was expanded by vast areas east of the Bug river, the Counties of Ratno and Luboml. Altogether, its total area was some 10,000 km2, remaining in the same shape until the first partition of Poland (1772).

Polish historian and ethnographer Zygmunt Gloger wrote in the 19th century that Chełm Land was an exclave of the Ruthenian Voivodeship, completely separated from it by the Belz Voivodeship. New research claims that in the area of sparsely populated Solska Forest, Belz Land might have bordered Ruthenian Voivodeship's Przemysl Land. The Bug divided Chełm Land into two unequal parts; in the smaller, sparsely populated eastern two counties, the source of the Prypec river was located, as well as several lakes and swamps of Polesie.

In the 15th century, Chełm Land was divided into the following counties: Chełm, Krasnystaw, Hrubieszow, Luboml and Ratno. In 1465, Hrubieszow County was annexed by Chełm County, and in ca. 1469, Chełm County annexed Luboml and Ratno Counties. After these changes, Chełm Land was divided into two counties: Chełm (area: 7900 km2.), and Krasnystaw (area: 2000 km2.). Furthermore, in southwestern corner of Krasnystaw County was a private Szczebrzeszyn County, also some parts of Chełm Land belonged to Zamoyski Family Fee Tail.

In the Polish–Lithuanian Commonwealth (1569–1795) most inhabitants of the eastern parts of Chełm Land were of Ruthenian origin while the majority of ethnic Poles lived in its western areas. Chełm Land also had Jewish, Armenian and Wallachian minorities. In the second half of the 16th century, the population of Chełm Land was app. 67,000. In 1636, the population grew to 125,000, but after the wars of the 1650s, such as Swedish invasion of Poland, the population shrank to app. 100,000. In 1667, there were 16 towns and 260 villages in Chełm County, while in Krasnystaw County there were 7 towns and 167 villages.

In 1772, the Habsburg Empire annexed southern part of Chełm Land, together with the town of Zamość. As a result of the first partition of Poland, almost whole Ruthenian Voivodeship became part of Austrian Galicia, and Chełm Land became an independent entity, which in 1793 was turned into Chełm Voivodeship. Following the third partition of Poland (1795) the voivodeship was divided between Austria (as part of West Galicia), and Russian Empire. This meant that Chełm Land in its original shape ceased to exist. Currently, historic Chełm Land belongs to three countries – Poland, Ukraine and Belarus.

Notes

Links

Kingdom of Galicia–Volhynia
Ziemias
Chełm
States and territories disestablished in 1772
States and territories established in 1387